The year 1947 was the 166th year of the Rattanakosin Kingdom of Thailand. It was the second year in the reign of King Bhumibol Adulyadej (Rama IX), and is reckoned as year 2490 in the Buddhist Era.

Incumbents
King: Bhumibol Adulyadej 
Crown Prince: (vacant)
Prime Minister: 
 until 8 November: Thawan Thamrongnawasawat 
 starting 10 November: Khuang Aphaiwong
Supreme Patriarch: Vajirananavongs

Events

January

February

March

April

May

June

July

August

September

October

November

December

Births
31 August- Somchai Wongsawat, Former Thai Prime Minister

Deaths

See also
 List of Thai films of 1947

References

External links

 
Thailand
Years of the 20th century in Thailand
Thailand
1940s in Thailand